The 1989–90 Colorado State Rams men's basketball team represented Colorado State University as a member of the Western Athletic Conference during the 1989–90 college basketball season. The team was led by head coach Boyd Grant. The Rams finished 21–9 and won the WAC regular season title with a 11–5 conference record. The team received an at-large bid to the NCAA tournament as the No. 10 seed in the West region. The Rams were beaten by No. 7 seed Alabama in the first round.

Roster

Schedule and results

|-
!colspan=9 style=| Regular season

|-
!colspan=9 style=| WAC tournament

|-
!colspan=9 style=| NCAA tournament

Rankings

References

Colorado State Rams men's basketball seasons
Colorado State
Colorado State
Colorado State Rams
Colorado State Rams